Chebanse is a village in Iroquois and Kankakee counties in the U.S. state of Illinois.  The population was 1,044 at the 2020 census. The Kankakee County portion of Chebanse is included in the Kankakee-Bradley, Illinois Metropolitan Statistical Area.

Geography
Interstate 57 passes the eastern edge of the village, with access from Exit 302. I-57 leads north  to Kankakee and south  to Champaign.

Chebanse is partly located in Iroquois County, but a portion extends northward into Kankakee County, thus into the Chicago metropolitan area.

History 
Chebanse was established in 1854 as the first stop on the Illinois Central Railroad south of Kankakee.

"Chebanse" derives from zhishibéns, meaning "the little duck" in the Potawatomi language.

Demographics 

As of the census of 2000, there were 1,148 people, 440 households, and 326 families residing in the village. The racial makeup of the village was 98.61% White, 0.26% African American, 0.26% Native American, 0.09% Asian, 0.44% from other races, and 0.35% from two or more races. Hispanic or Latino of any race were 1.13% of the population.

There were 440 households, out of which 35.7% had children under the age of 18 living with them, 61.8% were married couples living together, 9.8% had a female householder with no husband present, and 25.9% were non-families. 22.7% of all households were made up of individuals, and 12.5% had someone living alone who was 65 years of age or older.  The average household size was 2.59 and the average family size was 3.07.

In the village, the population was spread out, with 26.0% under the age of 18, 8.0% from 18 to 24, 29.1% from 25 to 44, 22.7% from 45 to 64, and 14.1% who were 65 years of age or older.  The median age was 38 years. For every 100 females there were 90.4 males.  For every 100 females age 18 and over, there were 89.9 males.

The median income for a household in the village was $50,066, and the median income for a family was $53,333. Males had a median income of $41,008 versus $21,607 for females. The per capita income for the village was $19,290.  About 2.1% of families and 3.2% of the population were below the poverty line, including 3.7% of those under age 18 and 2.6% of those age 65 or over.

Notable people

 Harold Gray, creator of the Little Orphan Annie comic strip, grew up on a farm near Chebanse

References

External links 
Village of Chebanse official website

Villages in Iroquois County, Illinois
Villages in Kankakee County, Illinois
Populated places established in 1854
1854 establishments in Illinois